Frenchie is a 1950 American Western film directed by Louis King and starring Joel McCrea and Shelley Winters. The plot is loosely based on the 1939 Western Destry Rides Again.

Plot
Frank Dawson is killed in the town of Bottleneck by his double-crossing partner Pete Lambert, leaving a young girl without a father. For the next 15 years, she lives in orphanages and works for the Fontaines, originally from Paris, earning her the nickname "Frenchie."

Now grown, she makes a fortune running a casino in New Orleans, then returns to Bottleneck to finally try to find her father's killer. She buys the casino the Scarlet Angel but learns that sheriff Tom Banning has cleaned up the town, forcing gamblers to go to nearby Chuckaluck, where the man in charge is Lambert.

Frenchie gets in touch with Lance Cole, a man who helped her in New Orleans, and asks him to come to Bottleneck to run the Scarlet Angel with her. Lambert's gambling interests are threatened, so he plans to ambush Cole's stage. Tom intervenes and prevents bloodshed.

Cole is in love with Frenchie and suspicious that Tom might be taking an interest in her. Tom's former fiancee, Diane, is jealous, too. She ended up marrying a rich banker, Clyde Gorman, only for his money. She and her husband rally the Bottleneck townspeople to get rid of these new gamblers in town.

Frenchie visits her father's grave, seen by Tom, who guesses correctly that she is Dawson's daughter. He rides to Chuckaluck to prevent trouble, but Lambert tries to shoot him.

The men of Bottleneck who want Frenchie gone head for the hills when she lies to them about a gold discovery there. Diane declares her love to Tom, who rejects her. Diane goes to the Scarlet Angel to confront Frenchie and lets it slip that her husband is Lambert's silent partner. The women get into a fight, which Tom breaks up.

Frenchie now knows the identities of the two men who murdered her dad. When she decides against vengeance, Cole figures she won't kill Gorman because that would make Diane a widow, free to be with Tom.

An unknown figure shoots Gorman in the back. Tom is accused and locked up in his own jail. Frenchie organizes a jailbreak, but Tom is suspicious because he thinks Frenchie could be setting him up to be gunned down by a posse.

Thinking that Tom is out of the way, Lambert and his men ride to Bottleneck to take Frenchie's casino by force. Tom is inside and tells Lambert that he is there to negotiate sale of the casino. Lambert goes inside. Tom tells him that he is taking him in for the murder of Frank Dawson. Lambert draws and Tom kills him in self-defense. When things look bleak for him, Diane confesses that it was she who killed her husband. Tom assumes that Frenchie will leave town now, but Frenchie goes into a cell, closes the door and throws away the key, letting Tom know she's not going anywhere.

Cast
 Joel McCrea as Tom Banning
 Shelley Winters as Frenchie
 Paul Kelly as Pete Lambert
 Elsa Lanchester as the Countess
 Marie Windsor as Diane Gorman
 John Russell as Lance Cole
 John Emery as the Banker, Clyde Gorman
 George Cleveland as Jefferson Harding
 Regis Toomey as Carter
 Frank Ferguson as Jim Dobbs
 Lawrence Dobkin as Joe the Bartender
 Chubby Johnson as miner
 Jerry Paris as Perry

References

External links
 
 
 

1950 films
1950 Western (genre) films
American Western (genre) films
Films directed by Louis King
Films scored by Hans J. Salter
1950s English-language films
1950s American films